Clifford Williams (born 1943) is an American professor of Philosophy at Wheaton College, Wheaton, Illinois. He is also Professor Emeritus of Philosophy at Trinity International University, Deerfield, Illinois. Williams graduated from Wheaton College in 1964 and from Indiana University with a Ph.D. in philosophy in 1972. He taught at St. John Fisher College in Rochester, New York from 1968 to 1982 with the exception of one semester at Houghton College. He then taught at Trinity International University from 1982 to 2012, becoming the chair of the philosophy department, with the exception of 1998–1999, where he taught at Wheaton College. He rejoined the faculty of Wheaton College in 2013. Williams is a historian of contemporary hobo culture and a part-time hobo, known in that subculture as "Oats."

Bibliography
 Free Will and Determinism: A Dialogue. Indianapolis: Hackett Publishing Company (1980).  , .
 Singleness of Heart: Restoring the Divided Soul.   Grand Rapids: Eerdmans (1994).  Vancouver: Regent College Publishing (2001): , .
 On Love and Friendship: Philosophical Readings, Editor. Sudbury: Jones and Bartlett Publishers (1995). , .
 The Life of the Mind: A Christian Perspective. Grand Rapids: Baker Book House (2002).  , .
 One More Train to Ride: The Underground World of Modern American Hoboes. Indianapolis: Indiana University Press (2003). , .
 Personal Virtues: Introductory Essays, Editor. Houndmills and New York: Palgrave Macmillan (2005). , .
 The Divided Soul: A Kierkegaardian Exploration. Eugene, OR: Wipf and Stock Publishers (2009). 
 The Wisdom of Kierkegaard: A Collection of Quotations on Faith and Life. Eugene, OR: Wipf and Stock Publishers (2009). 
 Existential Reasons for Belief in God: A Defense of Desires and Emotions for Faith. Downers Grove, IL: IVP Academic (2011).

See also
 Free will
 Determinism

References

1943 births
Living people
Trinity International University faculty
Hoboes